A Two-Fisted Sheriff is a 1925 American silent Western film directed by Ben F. Wilson and starring Yakima Canutt, Ruth Stonehouse and Joe Rickson.

Cast
 Yakima Canutt as Jerry O'Connell
 Ruth Stonehouse as Midge Blair
 Art Walker as Stranger
 Clifford Davidson as Stranger 
 Jack Woods as Stranger
 Joe Rickson as George Rivers
 Ben F. Wilson

References

Bibliography
 Connelly, Robert B. The Silents: Silent Feature Films, 1910-36, Volume 40, Issue 2. December Press, 1998.
 Munden, Kenneth White. The American Film Institute Catalog of Motion Pictures Produced in the United States, Part 1. University of California Press, 1997.

External links
 

1925 films
1925 Western (genre) films
1920s English-language films
American silent feature films
Silent American Western (genre) films
American black-and-white films
Films directed by Ben F. Wilson
Arrow Film Corporation films
1920s American films